The 1972–73 Football League Cup was the 13th season of the Football League Cup, a knock-out competition for England's top 92 football clubs. The tournament started on 15 August 1972 and ended with the final at Wembley on 3 March 1973.

Tottenham Hotspur won the tournament after defeating Norwich City in the final at Wembley Stadium, London.

Calendar
Of the 92 teams, 36 received a bye to the second round (teams ranked 1st–36th in the 1971–72 Football League) and the other 56 played in the first round. Semi-finals were two-legged.

First round

Ties

Replays

2nd Replays

Second round

Ties

Replays

2nd Replays

Third round

Ties

Replays

2nd Replays

Fourth round

Ties

Replay

Fifth round

Ties

Replays

Semi-finals

First Leg

Second Leg

Final

The final was held at Wembley Stadium, London on 3 March 1973.

The 1973 Football League Cup Final was won by Tottenham Hotspur. Spurs beat Norwich City 1–0 at Wembley Stadium, Ralph Coates with the goal.

References

General

Specific

1972–73
1972–73 domestic association football cups
Lea
Cup